Rodrigo Reyes (born on July 22, 1983) is a Mexican film director currently residing in the United States. He is best known for the film  499, which had its premiere at the 2020 Tribeca Film Festival. In 2017, Reyes received the Spotlight on Storytellers Award from Sundance Institute.

Career
Rodrigo Reyes is a Mexican-American award-winning film director, whose work has been screened around the world. His films primarily usually depict the lives and experiences of Mexicans living in both Mexico and the United States. Reyes directed several documentaries, among them Lupe Under the Sun, Purgatorio, and  499. Rodrigo is the recipient of numerous fellowships, including Guggenheim Fellowship, Sundance Institute, Kenneth Rainin Fellowship, and Tribeca Film Institute.

In 2013, Rodrigo was named by  Filmmaker Magazine as one of the 25 New Faces of Film.

In 2020, his film 499, received the Golden Frog award at Camerimage in docufiction.

Personal life
Rodrigo lives in California. In 2006, he earned his B.A. in International Studies from University of California, San Diego.

References

External links 
 
 Rodrigo Reyes official web site
 
 

1983 births
Living people
Mexican film directors
People from Mexico City
Mexican emigrants to the United States
University of California, San Diego alumni
Complutense University of Madrid alumni